Lajos Korányi-Kronenberger (15 May 1907 – 29 January 1981) was a Hungarian footballer. He played for Újszegedi TC, Csabai Előre, Ferencváros, Phöbus FC, Nemzeti SC and for the Hungarian national team. He appeared at the 1938 FIFA World Cup.

His brothers Mátyás and Désiré also played international football, the first with Hungary and the second with France.

1907 births
1981 deaths
Hungarian footballers
1938 FIFA World Cup players
Hungary international footballers
Ferencvárosi TC footballers
Association football defenders
Sportspeople from Szeged